Empresa Distribuidora y Comercializadora Norte S.A. is the largest Argentine distributor of electricity. It is headquartered in Buenos Aires.

Purchasing a majority stake in the newly privatized  in 1992, the company has an exclusive concession to distribute electricity in the northwestern section of Greater Buenos Aires, and in the north of Buenos Aires proper. Its 34,500 km (21,500 mi) of network and 2.5 million customers represent 18.5% of the Argentine market in its industry.

References

 Así es Edenor

Companies listed on the Buenos Aires Stock Exchange
Companies listed on the New York Stock Exchange
Electric power companies of Argentina
Companies based in Buenos Aires
Energy companies established in 1992
Argentine companies established in 1992